The kingdom is dominated by the Yankam people who have eventually lost their language to Hausa. located in the southern zone of plateau in Wase L.G.A is a district known Bashar.The town regard their chief as Rekna due to the history of their language. the town is known of a population of over 23,000 peaceful people. The people have made it easy for ALH. Adamu Idris to rule them for currently 57 years by uniting themselves. The history of Bashar have been tapped from different sources as expressed below.

Nomenclature
The Yangkam (Yaŋkam) people have been called ‘Bashar’ or ‘Basherawa’ (the Hausaised name for the people) in
almost all the literature (Greenberg 1963; Williamson 1971; Benue-Congo Comparative Wordlist; Hansford et al.
1976; Gerhardt 1989; Crozier & Blench 1992). The correct name of the Bashar language and people is Yàŋkàm,
plural aYaŋkam+. Although Yangkam has nearly disappeared as a language, the populations who formerly spoke it
are likely to retain Basherawa and Basheranci as their name for the people and language as long as they retain a
separate identity.

Location and settlements

The Yangkam live in a region west of Bashar town, 25 km north from Jarme on the Amper-Bashar road, Kanam
LGA, in Plateau State. Yangkam is spoken in some four villages, Tukur, Bayar, Pyaksam and Kiram [CAPRO also
mentions Gambam and Kwakkwani, but this was not confirmed]. There are many hamlets around Bashar town in
Wase local Government whose populations are ethnically Yangkam but who no longer speak the language.
In the two main cartographic sources, Hansford et al. (1976) and Blench and Crozier (1992) it is located quite
inaccurately. Section gives its correct location, and it should appear in a map correctly sited in the Millennium
edition of the Ethnologue (Grimes, forthcoming).

Language status
Crozier and Blench (1992) give a figure of 20,000 speakers of the language located in and around Bashar town,
some 50 km east of Amper on the Muri road. This estimate turned out to be entirely erroneous. The Bashar people
seem to have been heavily affected by nineteenth century slave raids, perhaps by the Jukun as well as the Hausa.
They were converted to Islam and a relatively powerful centre was established at Bashar. At the same time they
began to switch to speaking Hausa, while still retaining their Bashar identity.
In the region of Bashar town today, there are just two old men who remain reasonably fluent in the language, in the
village of Yuli, some 15 km northwest of Bashar. However, it turns out that at the time of the raids, the population
split into two and another group sought refuge in Tukur. However, even here Yangkam is only spoken by people
over fifty and all the young people speak Hausa. The local estimate of the number of fluent speakers is 100, and
falling every year. There seems to be no likelihood that Yangkam will be maintained as speakers are quite content
with the switch to Hausa, while remaining proud of their historical identity.

Yangkam history
The earliest account of Yangkam history is in Ames (1934:). A Hausa history of ‘Bashar’ is in circulation in
Bashar town but this has so far not been translated. CAPRO (ined.) contains a recent version of the Bashar
narrative. Yangkam say they are descendants of the Badar who migrated from the east (Saudi Arabia?) fleeing
forcible conversion. The Badar passed through the Sudan where they met with the Kanuri and together they moved
to Birni Gazargamu. When the Gazargamu kingdom fell, the people moved to Borno where they settled with the
Kanuri, Bolewa, Bade, and Bura in the present Borno State. The Kanuri went to settle at Dikwa, the Bolewa went
to Fika, the Bura went to Biu and the Bade to the Gashua area. The Yangkam and Jukun people decided to move
away from Borno. The Jukun went to establish Kwararafa, but the Yangkam people went to the Kaltungo area of
the present Bauchi State. When they moved away from the Kaltungo area they went to settle at Kwakwani and later
to the foot of Wase rock in Plateau State. They were there until they made peace with the Emir of Bauchi, Yakubu,
during the reign of Tartar. When Tartar made peace, Yakubu Bauchi asked Madaki Hassan to stay in the Wase area
with the Yangkam people. Soon after Hassan got to Wase, the Yangkam were faced with many conflicts. It is said
that though the Yangkam gave Madaki Hassan and his people a place to stay, and room to farm, he did not respect
them and sold their children as slaves. So the Yangkam people moved away from Wase rock to Ganuwa.
Shortly after reaching Ganuwa, Tartar, the chief of Yangkam, died. A message about his death was sent to Bauchi
to inform Emir Yakubu, who sent his condolences to the Yangkam and urged them to appoint the son to succeed
the father. He said the son should come to Bauchi for the turbaning. When the Yangkam people were preparing for
the installation of the new chief, they agreed among themselves that when they reached Bauchi they should accept
Islam as their religion. When the turbaning ceremony was over, the people told Emir Yakubu about their interest in
becoming Muslims. Yakubu was very happy and gave them an Islamic flag, the sword and other symbols of Islam
for them to take back home. This is the genesis of Islam among the Yangkam people, and today it is difficult to
find a Yangkam man identifying with any other religion than Islam. In fact, Bashar town is known in its
neighbourhood as an Islamic town. Bashar and Wase towns have produced many prominent Islamic scholars.
The son of Tartar was recognised by the Yangkam people as the first chief to be turbaned by the Fulani. His name
was Karo and he was succeeded by Yamusa. But during the reign of Abubakar the people left Ganuwa to settle in
Gwaram, south of the present Yangkam town, because of wars (yakin Kalumbu). After ten years Abubakar founded
the present Bashar town, in the area that they are still occupying. Abubakar was succeeded by Muhammadu
Lamlam, then followed a series of short reigns. At present Usman Idris, also known as Hakimin Bashar, rules,
subject to the king of Wase. The chief among the Yangkam is known as the Rekna Bashar. The Yangkam ruling
clan is known as Argando while the kingmakers include the Madakin Bashar, Kuyanbaba Bashar, Mansu Bashar
and the Imam (Islamic religious leader) of Bashar.

Yangkam culture
Before the Yangkam people embraced Islam, their traditional customs and religion were closely related to those of
the Boghom people. Before marriage, the suitor had to serve the in-laws in the farm, give a hand-woven white
cloth (alikyala), do building and roofing and give animals as bride-price.
Yangkam burial rites were like those of the Boghom. They used to remove the skull of the deceased for
observation after three months. Naming and circumcision rites were formerly similar with those of the Boghom,
although today all these rites are performed according to Islamic laws.
The Yangkam have the same name as the Boghom for the Supreme Being, Bappi, as well as formerly having
masquerades and shrines. But today these have fallen into disuse since conversion to Islam. Although Christianity
was brought to Yangkam in 1968, by Mr. Bala Abdu, a COCIN evangelist, they rejected it. When some non-
Yangkam residents accepted the gospel, the chief was reluctant to give them land to built a place of worship.

References

Plateau State